Lisa Nicole France (born 8 January 1974) is an Australian Liberal National politician who was the member of the Legislative Assembly of Queensland for Pumicestone from 2012 to 2015. She was appointed Assistant Minister for Natural Resources and Mines on 3 April 2012.

References 

Liberal National Party of Queensland politicians
1974 births
Living people
Members of the Queensland Legislative Assembly
Women members of the Queensland Legislative Assembly
People from Nambour, Queensland
21st-century Australian politicians
21st-century Australian women politicians